Kevin Hilet (6 February 1929 – 20 March 2006) was  a former Australian rules footballer who played with South Melbourne in the Victorian Football League (VFL).

Notes

External links 
		

1929 births
2006 deaths
Australian rules footballers from Victoria (Australia)
Sydney Swans players
Yarrawonga Football Club players